This article lists the results for the Scotland national football team between 1940 and 1959. Scotland did not play any official matches between 1940 and 1945 because competitive football was suspended for the duration of the Second World War. Several unofficial internationals, some known as Victory Internationals, were played during this time.

Key

Key to matches
Att. = Match attendance
(H) = Home ground
(A) = Away ground
(N) = Neutral ground

Key to record by opponent
Pld = Games played
W = Games won
D = Games drawn
L = Games lost
GF = Goals for
GA = Goals against

Results
Scotland's score is shown first in each case.

Record by opponent

British Home Championship record by season

Notes

References

External links
RSSSF: Scotland - International Results
Scottish FA: National Team Archive

1946-1979
1939–40 in Scottish football
1940–41 in Scottish football
1941–42 in Scottish football
1942–43 in Scottish football
1943–44 in Scottish football
1944–45 in Scottish football
1945–46 in Scottish football
1946–47 in Scottish football
1947–48 in Scottish football
1948–49 in Scottish football
1949–50 in Scottish football
1950–51 in Scottish football
1951–52 in Scottish football
1952–53 in Scottish football
1953–54 in Scottish football
1954–55 in Scottish football
1955–56 in Scottish football
1956–57 in Scottish football
1957–58 in Scottish football
1958–59 in Scottish football
1959–60 in Scottish football